Matthew Edward Wilson (born September 27, 1964) is an American jazz drummer.

Early life and education
Wilson was born in Knoxville, Illinois. He studied percussion at Wichita State University.

Career 
Wilson moved to New York City in 1992, and has worked with Lee Konitz, Cecil McBee, and Dewey Redman. When asked who influenced him as a performer and educator, Matt responds: "There’s not one person I could point to because there’s a lot of them."

Discography

As leader
 As Wave Follows Wave (Palmetto, 1996)
 Going Once, Going Twice (Palmetto, 1998)
 Smile (Palmetto, 1999)
 Arts and Crafts (Palmetto, 2001)
 Humidity (Palmetto, 2003)
 Wake Up! (Palmetto, 2005)
 The Scenic Route (Palmetto, 2006)
 That's Gonna Leave a Mark (Palmetto, 2009)
 An Attitude for Gratitude (Palmetto, 2011)
 Gathering Call (Palmetto, 2013)
 Honey and Salt (Palmetto, 2017). Matt Wilson recorded this album with Ron Miles.
 Hug! (Palmetto, 2020)

As sideman
With Dena DeRose
 I Can See Clearly Now (Sharp Nine, 2000)
 We Won't Forget You (HighNote, 2014)
 United (HighNote, 2016)

With Either/Orchestra
 The Calculus of Pleasure (Accurate, 1992)
 The Brunt (Accurate, 1994)
 Across the Omniverse (Accurate, 1996)

With Fred Hess
 The Long and Short of It (Tapestry, 2004)
 Crossed Paths (Tapestry, 2005)
 How 'Bout Now (Tapestry, 2006)
 In the Grotto (Alison, 2007)
 Single Moment (Alison, 2008)
 Hold On (Dazzle 2009)

With Bill Mays
 Out in PA (No Blooze Music, 1999)
 Summer Sketches (Palmetto, 2001)
 Going Home (Palmetto, 2003)
 Live at Jazz Standard (Palmetto, 2005)
 Live at COTA (No Blooze Music, 2019)

With Ted Nash
 Sidewalk Meeting (Arabesque, 2001)
 La Espada De La Noche (Palmetto, 2005)
 In the Loop (Palmetto, 2006)
 The Mancini Project (Palmetto, 2008)
 Live at Dizzy's Club Coca-Cola (Plastic Sax, 2018)

With Mario Pavone
 Remembering Thomas (Knitting Factory, 1999)
 Totem Blues (Knitting Factory, 2000)
 Mythos (Playscape, 2002)
 Boom (Playscape, 2004)
 Trio Arc (Playscape, 2008)

With Denny Zeitlin
 Slick Rock (Maxjazz, 2004)
 In Concert (Sunnyside, 2009)
 Stairway to the Stars (Sunnyside, 2014)
 Wishing On the Moon (Sunnyside, 2018)
 Live at Mezzrow (Sunnyside, 2020)

With others
 Karrin Allyson, Round Midnight (Concord Jazz, 2011)
 Helio Alves, Portrait in Black and White (Reservoir, 2003)
 Jay Anderson, Deepscape (SteepleChase, 2019)
 Steve Beresford, Snodland (Nato, 2011)
 Andy Biskin, Dogmental (GM, 2000)
 Jane Ira Bloom, Mental Weather (Outline, 2008)
 Jane Ira Bloom, Sixteen Sunsets (Outline, 2013)
 Michael Blake, Drift (Intuition, 2000)
 Steve Cardenas, Charlie & Paul (Newvelle, 2018)
 Thomas Chapin, Never Let Me Go (Playscape, 2012)
 Caleb Chapman, A Crescent Christmas Vol 1 (Rlegacy, 2012)
 Allan Chase, Dark Clouds with Silver Linings (Accurate, 1995)
 Alexis Cole, Someday My Prince Will Come (Venus, 2009)
 Georges Delerue, Music from the Films of Francois Truffaut (Nonesuch, 1997)
 Dominique Eade, When the Wind Was Cool (RCA Victor, 1997)
 Marty Ehrlich, A Trumpet in the Morning (New World, 2013)
 Oran Etkin, What's New? Reimaging Benny Goodman (Motema, 2015)
 Jacob Fischer, In New York City (Arbors, 2015)
 Joel Frahm, Sorry, no decaf (Palmetto, 1999)
 Don Friedman, Almost Everything (SteepleChase, 1995)
 Larry Goldings, Quartet (Palmetto, 2006)
 Brad Goode, By Myself (SteepleChase, 2001)
 Charlie Haden, Not in Our Name (Verve, 2005)
 Charlie Haden, Time/Life (Impulse!, 2016)
 Matt Haimovitz, Meeting of the Spirits (Oxingale, 2010)
 Mary Halvorson, Sifter (Relative Pitch, 2013)
 Ron Horton, Subtextures (Fresh Sound, 2003)
 Hank Jones, Alone Together (Edition Longplay, 2012)
 Vic Juris, Pastels (SteepleChase, 1996)
 Frank Kimbrough, Lullabluebye (Palmetto, 2004)
 Frank Kimbrough, Live at Kitano (Palmetto, 2012)
 Lee Konitz, Strings for Holiday (Enja, 1996)
 Lee Konitz, Gong with Wind Suite (SteepleChase, 2002)
 Andy LaVerne, Pianissimo (SteepleChase, 2002)
 David Liebman, Liebman Plays Puccini (Arkadia Jazz 2001)
 Steven Lugerner, For We Have Heard (NoBusiness, 2013)
 Rita Marcotulli, The Very Thought of You (GoFour, 2019)
 Cecil McBee, Unspoken (Palmetto, 1996)
 John McNeil, East Coast Cool (OmniTone, 2006)
 Myra Melford, The Whole Tree Gone (Firehouse 12, 2010)
 Josh Nelson, Let It Go (Omagatoki, 2007)
 Sam Newsome, The Tender Side of Sammy Straighthorn (SteepleChase, 1998)
 The Herbie Nichols Project, Strange City (Palmetto, 2001)
 Fritz Pauer, New York Meeting (Jive Music, 1998)
 Ken Peplowski, Maybe September (Capri, 2013)
 Ken Peplowski, Enrapture (Capri, 2016)
 Noah Preminger, Before the Rain (Palmetto, 2011)
 Bruno Raberg, Lifelines (OrbisMusic, 2008)
 Dewey Redman, In London (Palmetto, 1997)
 Ken Schaphorst, How to Say Goodbye (JCA, 2016)
 Larry Schneider, Jazz (SteepleChase, 2001)
 Janis Siegel, The Tender Trap (Monarch, 1999)
 Gary Smulyan, Bella Napoli (Capri, 2013)
 Mark Soskin, 17 (TCB, 2001)
 Mark Soskin, Everything Old Is New Again (SteepleChase, 2020)
 Bob Stewart, Connections (Sunnyside, 2014)
 Curtis Stigers, You Inspire Me (Concord Jazz, 2003)
 Curtis Stigers, I Think It's Going to Rain Today (Concord Jazz, 2005)
 Mark Taylor, Circle Squared (Mark Taylor, 2002)
 Joris Teepe & Don Braden, Conversations (Creative Perspective Music, 2016)
 Jeremy Udden, Torchsongs (Fresh Sound, 2006)
 Dawn Upshaw, Dawn Upshaw Sings Rodgers & Hart (Nonesuch, 1996)
 Tom Varner, Second Communion (OmniTone, 2001)

References

External links
 Official site

1964 births
Living people
20th-century American drummers
20th-century American male musicians
American jazz drummers
American male drummers
American male jazz musicians
Palmetto Records artists